is a Japanese voice actress from Tokyo. She is employed by the talent management firm Production Baobab.

Filmography

Anime
Aesop World (Moguran, Usagi)
Aquarian Age: Sign for Evolution (reporter)
Atashin'chi (Yukarin's grandmother)
Misha the Black Bear (Mrs. Taiga)
Detective Conan (Kotoya Ryokan proprietor, Matsuko)
Cooking Papa (Kokku-san, Mrs. Higashiyama, Hatsue, child, others)
Crayon Shin-chan (Warugaki, young lady, old lady)
Doraemon (Nobita's mother (1st))
Fate/Zero (Martha Mackenzie)
Fushigi Yûgi (Amiboshi's mother)
Game Center Arashi (Garae Ishino)
GetBackers (Ban Mido)
Gyakuten Ippatsuman (Granny)
Haikara-san ga Tōru (Countess Ijūin (Shinobu's mother))
Ijiwaru Baa-san (Hana)
Ippatsu Kanta-kun (Opponent team member B, Boy B, Michiko)
Jankenman (Umeboshi Grandma)
Kaibutsu kun (TV) 2 (Gameru)
Kaiketsu Zorro no Densetsu (Maria)
Karakuri Kiden Hiwō Senki (Fuku)
Konjiki no Gash Bell!! (Riri)
Kiko-chan's Smile (Kindergarten Principal, nursing mother)
Magical Star Magical Emi (Haruko Nakamori)
Maison Ikkoku (Ikuko Otonashi's mother)
Mashin Eiyūden Wataru (Old Witch)
Metal Fighter Miku (Masayo Harajuku)
Mikan Enikki (Okiyo)
Mister Ajikko (Otomi)
Nintama Rantarō (Kyūsaku Nose (1st))
Ōgon Yūsha Goldoran (Old woman, Mama)
Oku-sama wa Mahō Shōjo: Bewitched Agnes (Maiko Motohira)
Paul no Miracle Taisakusen (Jim)
Pro Golfer Saru (Daimaru Sarutani)
Samurai 7 (Setsu)
Speed Grapher (Mrs. Morishita)
Time Bokan (Akazukin, Merry)
Tokimeki Tonight (Rara)
Touch (Kikue)
Turn A Gundam (Head Nurse) Uncredited 
Uchūsen Sagittarius (Nara)
Urusei Yatsura (mother)
Windy Tales (Old lady)
Yatterman (Nightingirl, Okappa, Nobleman's wife, Customer A, Cleopatra)
YAWARA! a fashionable judo girl! (Yuki Tōdō)
Zenderman (Zushiō)

OVA
Shishunki Bishōjo Gattai Robo Z-Mind (Koto Hanakawado)

Films
Doraemon: Nobita and the Animal Planet (Gorirō)
Doraemon the Movie: Nobita's Spaceblazer (Bubu)
Gauche the Cellist (Orchestra member)
Mobile Suit Gundam F91 (Mrs. Elm)
xxxHolic - A Midsummer Night's Dream

Dubbing
Blue Steel (1993 Fuji TV edition) (Shirley Turner (Louise Fletcher))

Sources:

References

External links
 Official agency profile 
 

1951 births
Living people
Japanese video game actresses
Japanese voice actresses
Production Baobab voice actors
Voice actresses from Tokyo
20th-century Japanese actresses
21st-century Japanese actresses